Maldives political crisis may refer to:

2011–12 Maldives political crisis
2018 Maldives political crisis